Robert W. Blevins Jr. (born January 16, 1985) is an American professional baseball player who is a free agent. Blevins grew up in Briarcliff Manor, New York and attended Briarcliff High School there and Le Moyne College in Syracuse, New York.

Playing career
Bobby Blevins attended Briarcliff High School, where he played for the Bears and was a successful pitcher there. Blevins graduated from the high school in 2003, and then attended Le Moyne College; there he played in NCAA's Division I for four years. He then made his professional debut in late 2007 with the Ogden Raptors team.

In 2013, he agreed to pitch for Fortitudo Baseball Bologna in the 2013 Asia Series. He was drafted by the Los Angeles Dodgers in 2007, in the thirteenth round of the June 2007 "First Year Player" draft. He played four seasons with the Dodgers.

Blevins later played for the Long Island Ducks; until May 11, 2016, when Blevins signed with the Acereros de Monclova of the Mexican Baseball League.

References

External links

1985 births
Living people
Acereros de Monclova players
Albuquerque Isotopes players
American expatriate baseball players in Canada
American expatriate baseball players in Mexico
American expatriate baseball players in Taiwan
Baseball players from Syracuse, New York
Brother Elephants players
Chattanooga Lookouts players
Great Lakes Loons players
Inland Empire 66ers of San Bernardino players
Le Moyne Dolphins baseball players
Long Island Ducks players
Mexican League baseball pitchers
Navegantes del Magallanes players
American expatriate baseball players in Venezuela
Ogden Raptors players
People from Briarcliff Manor, New York
Québec Capitales players
Rockland Boulders players
Somerset Patriots players
Sugar Land Skeeters players